The Kermadec scalyfin, Parma kermadecensis, is a damselfish of the genus Parma, found around New Zealand's Kermadec Islands around depths of between 3 and 20 m, over shallow rocky reef areas. Its maximum length recorded is 22 centimeters.

References

External links
 Royal Society of NZ

Kermadec scalyfin
Endemic marine fish of New Zealand
Fauna of the Kermadec Islands
Fish described in 1987